The 1993 NCAA Skiing Championships were contested at the Steamboat Ski Resort on Mount Werner near Steamboat Springs, Colorado as the 39th annual NCAA-sanctioned ski tournament to determine the individual and team national champions of men's and women's collegiate slalom and cross-country skiing in the United States.

Utah, coached by Pat Miller, won the team championship, their seventh overall and sixth as a co-ed team.

Venue

This year's NCAA skiing championships were contested at the Steamboat Ski Resort at Mount Werner in Steamboat Springs, Colorado. 

These were the ninth championships held in the state of Colorado and the fourth at Steamboat Springs (previously 1968, 1969 and 1979).

Program

Men's events
 Cross country, 10 kilometer classical
 Cross country, 20 kilometer freestyle
 Slalom
 Giant slalom

Women's events
 Cross country, 5 kilometer classical
 Cross country, 15 kilometer freestyle
 Slalom
 Giant slalom

Team scoring

 DC – Defending champions

See also
 List of NCAA skiing programs

References

1993 in Colorado
NCAA Skiing Championships
NCAA Skiing Championships
1993 in alpine skiing
1993 in cross-country skiing